Douglas A. Fessenden (September 7, 1901 – June 11, 1970) was an American football coach and college athletics administrator.

Fessenden began his coaching career in 1925 at Main Avenue High School—now known as Fox Tech High School—in San Antonio, Texas.  He moved to Brownsville High School in Brownsville, Texas in 1928.  Fessenden was head football coach at Fenger High School in Chicago from 1930 to 1934, before coming head coach at the University of Montana in April 1935. Fessenden served two separate stints as Montana's head coach, from 1935 to 1941 and again from 1946 to 1948.

The 1937 season included a then school record of six consecutive victories. Fessenden resigned as Montana's football coach after the 1948 season and received his doctors degree in physical education from Columbia University in 1949. Fessenden concluded his coaching career with Montana's best win and loss record.

Fessenden died in San Francisco, California on June 11, 1970.

Head coaching record

College

References

External links
 

 

1901 births
1970 deaths
Illinois Fighting Illini men's track and field athletes
Montana Grizzlies and Lady Griz athletic directors
Montana Grizzlies football coaches
High school football coaches in Illinois
High school football coaches in Texas
Teachers College, Columbia University alumni
University of Montana alumni
United States Army Air Forces personnel of World War II
United States Army Air Forces officers
People from Monona County, Iowa
Military personnel from Iowa